Nightmute Airport  is a state-owned public-use airport located southeast of the central business district of Nightmute, a village in the Bethel Census Area of the U.S. state of Alaska.

Although most U.S. airports use the same three-letter location identifier for the FAA and IATA, this airport is assigned IGT by the FAA and NME by the IATA.

Facilities 
Nightmute Airport has one runway designated 3/21 with a gravel surface measuring 1,600 by 50 feet (488 x 15 m).

Airlines and destinations

References

External links 
 FAA Alaska airport diagram (GIF)
 Resources for this airport:
 
 
 

Airports in the Bethel Census Area, Alaska